Constitution Avenue is a major east-west street in the city of Washington, D.C., USA.

 Constitution Avenue, Canberra, a street in Canberra, Australia
 Constitution Avenue (Islamabad), a street in Islamabad, Pakistan
 Constitution Avenue, Vilnius (Konstitucijos Avenue), a street in Vilnius, Lithuania

See also
U.S. Route 50, a US highway which includes Constitution Avenue